Uebelmannia gummifera is a species of plant in the family Cactaceae. It is endemic to Brazil.  Its natural habitat is dry savanna. It is threatened by habitat loss.

References

Sources

Flora of Brazil
Uebelmannia
Vulnerable plants
Taxonomy articles created by Polbot